An alert state or state of alert is an indication of the state of readiness of the armed forces for military action or a state against natural disasters, terrorism or military attack. The term frequently used is "on high alert". Examples scales indicating alert state are the DEFCON levels of the US military, South Korea's "Jindogae" system, and the UK Threat Levels. High alert states are synonymous with "red alert".

See also

References

Military life
Alert measurement systems